McColl Partners, LLC is an investment bank that provides services to middle-market companies and financial institutions.  McColl Partners advises clients in three primary areas: Mergers and Acquisitions (M&A), Private Capital Raises, and Strategic Advisory and Valuation Assignments.

History 
McColl Partners was founded in September 2001 by Hugh McColl, David Vorhoff, Phil Colaco, Lorin DeMordaunt, Eric Andreozzi, Jamie Lewin and Brad Winer.  The firm is based in Charlotte, North Carolina and has offices in Atlanta, Georgia,  Dallas, Texas and Los Angeles, California.  Through its international partnership in Clairfield Partners, the firm also has a dozen other offices around the world.

McColl Partners was acquired by Deloitte in June 2013.

References

External links
McColl Partners website

Investment banks